Márton Dina (born 11 April 1996) is a Hungarian cyclist, who currently rides for UCI Continental team .

Major results
2016
 3rd Road race, National Under-23 Road Championships
2018
 4th Road race, National Road Championships
 5th Overall Carpathian Couriers Race
 8th Road race, UEC European Under-23 Road Championships
2019
 2nd Overall Tour de Hongrie
 3rd Grand Prix Gazipaşa
 5th Time trial, National Road Championships
 8th Overall Tour of Rhodes
 9th GP Adria Mobil
2022
 2nd Road race, National Road Championships

Grand Tour general classification results timeline

References

External links

1996 births
Living people
Hungarian male cyclists
Cyclists from Budapest
European Games competitors for Hungary
Cyclists at the 2019 European Games
21st-century Hungarian people